The First cabinet of Hermann Jónasson was formed 28 July 1934.

Cabinets

Inaugural cabinet

Change (20 March 1938)

See also 

1934 establishments in Iceland
1938 disestablishments in Iceland
Hermann Jonasson, First cabinet of
Cabinets established in 1934
Cabinets disestablished in 1938
Progressive Party (Iceland)